Raymond A. "Chip" Mason is the founder, and was the Chairman and CEO of Baltimore-based investment firm Legg Mason until 2007.
He founded the brokerage company at age 25, and went public in 1974.

The Mason School of Business at the College of William & Mary in Virginia was named after Mason, an alumnus of the institution, in 2005.

Mason has chaired the Securities Industry Association, the board of governors of the National Association of Securities Dealers, the United Way of Central Maryland Campaign, the Maryland Business Roundtable for Education and the Greater Baltimore Committee, as well as a past board member of the Baltimore Museum of Art and the US National Aquarium.

References

American chief executives of financial services companies
Year of birth missing (living people)
Living people
College of William & Mary alumni